Tyndall is a designated place within the Rural Municipality of Brokenhead in the Canadian province of Manitoba. It forms part of the Local Urban District of Tyndall-Garson.

History 
Tyndall was founded in 1893.

Demographics 

Government 
Tyndall is governed by the Rural Municipality of Brokenhead. As part of the Local Urban District of Tyndall-Garson, it is further governed by a committee of three elected officials that have a mandate to render decisions on maintenance of public infrastructure and enforcement of bylaws.

See also 
List of communities in Manitoba
List of designated places in Manitoba

References 

Designated places in Manitoba